Five-spice powder is a spice mixture of five or more spices used predominantly in almost all branches of Chinese cuisine. It is also used in Hawaiian cuisine and Vietnamese cuisine.  The five flavors of the spices (sweet, bitter, sour, salty, and savory) refers to the five traditional Chinese elements.

Ingredients

While there are many variants, a common mix is:
Star anise 
Cloves
Chinese cinnamon
Sichuan pepper
Fennel seeds
Other recipes may contain anise seed, ginger root, nutmeg, turmeric, Amomum villosum pods, Amomum cardamomum pods, licorice, Mandarin orange peel or galangal.

In Southern China, Cinnamomum loureiroi and Mandarin orange peel are commonly used as substitutes for Cinnamomum cassia and cloves respectively. These ingredients collectively produce southern five-spice powders' distinctive, slightly different flavor profile. In one study, the potential antioxidant capacities of Chinese five-spice powder (consisting of Sichuan pepper, fennel seed, cinnamon, star anise, and clove) with varying proportion of individual spice ingredients was investigated through four standard methods. The results suggest that clove is the major contributor to the high antioxidant capacities of the five-spice powder whereas the other four ingredients contribute to the flavor.

Use
Five spice may be used with fatty meats such as pork, duck or goose. It is used as a spice rub for chicken, duck, pork and seafood, in red cooking recipes, or added to the breading for fried foods. Five spice is used in recipes for Cantonese roasted duck, as well as beef stew. It is used as a marinade for Vietnamese broiled chicken. The five-spice powder mixture has followed the Chinese diaspora and has been incorporated into other national cuisines throughout Asia.

In Hawaii, some restaurants place a shaker of the spice on each patron's table. A seasoned salt can be easily made by dry-roasting common salt with five-spice powder under low heat in a dry pan until the spice and salt are well mixed.

Five-spice powder can also add complexity and savoriness to sweets and savory dishes alike.  It has a traditional use as an antiseptic and used to cure indigestion.

See also

List of culinary herbs and spices
Ngo hiang
Panch phoron
Shichimi

References

Cantonese cuisine
Hawaiian cuisine
Herb and spice mixtures
Powders